The Bill Gunn Dam is an earth-fill embankment dam with an un-gated spillway located off-stream in Laidley Heights in the South East region of  Queensland, Australia. The main purpose of the dam is for irrigation of the Lockyer Valley. The resultant reservoir is called Lake Dyer.

Location and features
The dam was named after the Queensland politician Bill Gunn and is managed by SEQ Water.

Water from the dam is used for irrigation, in the densely cropped Lockyer Valley. Bill Gunn Dam suffers from high drawdowns and summer evaporation which together with phosphate fertilizer creates significant blue green algae problems.  In November 2005, during drought conditions in the area, the dam's water level declined to just 1%.

Recreation
A boating permit is not required, however a maximum of eight boats are allowed on the lake at once.  A single concrete boat ramp and some facilities for visitors, including campers, are available at a lakeside caravan park which is managed by the local council.

The dam is stocked with silver perch and golden perch, while bony bream, spangled perch and eel-tailed catfish breed naturally. A Stocked Impoundment Permit is required to fish in the dam. The poor water quality means that fish caught in the dam may, at times of an algae outbreak, be a health hazard if eaten.

See also

List of dams in Queensland

References

External links
Sweetwater Fishing, Lake Dyer/Bill Gunn Dam

Dyer, Lake
Lockyer Valley Region
Dams in Queensland
Embankment dams
Dams completed in 1987
1987 establishments in Australia
Earth-filled dams